"Sous le ciel de Paris" is a song initially written for the 1951 French film Sous le ciel de Paris, directed by Julien Duvivier. In the film it was sung by Jean Bretonnière.

In the same year it was also recorded by Juliette Gréco, as well as Anny Gould. Thanks to Gréco and subsequent recordings by artists such as Édith Piaf (1954) and Yves Montand (1964) which popularised it, the song became a symbol of Paris for the world.

Writing and composition 
The song was written for the film by Hubert Giraud (music) and Jean Dréjac (lyrics).

Other language versions and covers 
The song has been also notably recorded by:
 Mireille Mathieu (both in French and in German under the title "Unter dem Himmel von Paris")
 Zaz, Belinda Carlisle, Mieke & Bart Kaëll (in Dutch under the title "Onder de blauwe lucht van Parijs)
 Hildegard Knef (in German under the title "Unter dem Himmel von Paris")
 Plácido Domingo with Josh Groban
 Florence Coste & Julien Dassin
 Lisa Angell
 Matthias Lens
 André Rieu
 Henri Pelissier
 Line Renaud
 Karrin Allyson (in French under the title "Sous le ciel de Paris (Under Paris Skies)")
 Enrico Macias
 Willy Bischof
 Pablo Alborán
 Jill Barber.

English lyrics were written for the song by Kim Gannon. The English version was titled "Under Paris Skies". It was recorded in that form by:
 Andy Williams (for his 1960 album Under Paris Skies)
 Bing Crosby (for his 1962 LP Holiday in Europe)
 Jane Morgan (for her 1964 album The Last Time I Saw Paris)
 Sam Cooke
 Chris Connor
and many others.

The melody of the song is used as a background for the song "Live Circus" on the concert album Glitter and Doom Live by Tom Waits.

References 

1951 songs
Songs written for films
Songs written by Hubert Giraud
Édith Piaf songs
Yves Montand songs
Zaz (singer) songs
Mireille Mathieu songs
Belinda Carlisle songs
Plácido Domingo songs
Josh Groban songs
Andy Williams songs
Bing Crosby songs
Sam Cooke songs
Pablo Alborán songs
Songs with lyrics by Kim Gannon
Songs written by Jean Dréjac
Songs about Paris